Portia Gwanzura & Hohodza Band is a UK based Zimbabwean band formed in 1992. One of its main aims is to promote Zimbabwean culture.

History

Formation
The band members were mainly self-taught, drawing heavily on their traditional musical and dancing roots. Their first show was in 1992 in Harare.

(1995) Mudzimu Hautengwi

(1996) Dande

(1997-2001)
Release 7 more albums (including Dzorai Moyo, Hupenyu, and Zvinoda Kushinga)

(2002) Ndotamba Naniko

Bandmembers
 Portia P. Gwanzura and Simbarashe "Simba" Mudzingwa – lead vocals
 various other musicians and dancers.

Tours

UK
 Ashbourne Festival 2005.
 Manchester 2002 Commonwealth Games 2002.

Notes

External links 
Official website

Zimbabwean musical groups